What It Was is an album by American jazz guitarist Steve Masakowski featuring performances recorded in 1993 for the Blue Note Records label.

Reception
In a Downbeat magazine review, the album received a 4½ stars rating.

Track listing
All compositions by Steve Masakowski  except as indicated
 "Tino’s Blues" – 4:17
 "What It Was" – 5:57
 "The Big Easy" – 6:10
 "Hector’s Lecture" – 4:38
 "Budapest" – 8:00
 "Stepping Stone" – 5:18
 "Southern Blue" – 5:58
 "Joao" – 2:56
 "Starling" – 4:29
 "Quiet Now" (Denny Zeitlin) – 4:32
 "Alexandra" – 3:40
 "Jesus’ Last Ballad" (Gianni Bedori)– 2:52
 Recorded at the New Orleans Recording Co., April 1993, and Studio 13, New Orleans, LA, n.d.

Personnel
Steve Masakowski – Seven-string guitar
Rick Margitza – tenor saxophone
Michael Pellera – piano, keyboard
Larry Sieberth – keyboard
David Torkanowsky – keyboard
James Genus – electric bass
Bill Huntington – acoustic bass
James Singleton (musician) – acoustic bass
Ricky Sebastian – drums
Johnny Vidacovich - drums
Don Alias – percussion
Hector Gallardo – bongos

References

Blue Note Records albums
Steve Masakowski albums
1993 albums